The Book of Wumu is a fictional military treatise mentioned in Jin Yong's Condor Trilogy. The book was written by the Song dynasty general Yue Fei.

Early history
Prior to his execution, Song general Yue Fei detailed his military tactics and experience against the Jin forces in writing during captivity, titled Vital Information Against the Jins, in hopes that future generations will continue his mission to restore China with his text. After his death, the book is later renamed Book of Wumu and was hidden in a cave covered by a waterfall, 15 steps east of Cuihan Hall in the imperial palace in Lin'an (present-day Hangzhou). The book was later stolen by Shangguan Jiannan, the chief of the Iron Palm Gang, and brought back to Iron Palm Peak and hidden in the gang's forbidden grounds.

The Legend of the Condor Heroes
The book is highly sought after by the Jurchens of the Jin Empire, enemies of the Han Chinese-ruled Song Empire. The Jurchens hope to use the military strategies described in the book to defeat the Mongols in the north and conquer the Song Empire.

Wanyan Honglie, the sixth prince of Jin, travels to Song in disguise to find the book. He enlists the help of Ouyang Feng, Ouyang Ke, Peng Lianhu, Sha Tongtian and other martial artists. They break into the palace and enter the cave, where they find a box, which supposedly contains the book. Guo Jing fights with Ouyang Feng to prevent him from stealing the book, but is severely wounded when Yang Kang betrays and stabs him. Guo survives with the help of Huang Rong and recovers from his injuries seven days later.

Guo and Huang discover a map to the book's location in Qu Lingfeng's rundown inn and realise that the book is actually on Iron Palm Peak. They travel there and succeed in retrieving the book. Guo later uses the knowledge he acquired from the book to lead the Mongol army to victory in the war against the Khwarezm Empire. However, as Guo is unwilling to side with the Mongols to conquer his native land in the Song Empire, he leaves Mongolia for good and returns to Song.

The Return of the Condor Heroes
In the sequel, the adult Guo Jing dedicates his life to defending the Song Empire from foreign invasion. By then, the Jin Empire had been conquered by the Mongols, who proceed to attack Song and Dali thereafter. Guo uses the tactics from the Book of Wumu, his understanding of Mongol warfare, Xiangyang's natural barriers (the Han River waterways and the surrounding mountains), and his allies from the wulin (martial artists' community) to counter the invaders for 46 years. However, after the loss of a nearby fortified city Fancheng, Guo Jing eventually dies a martyr when Xiangyang finally falls to the Mongols.

Before Guo's death, he hid the Book of Wumu in the blade of the Dragon Slaying Saber. The latest edition of The Heaven Sword and Dragon Saber states that the manual was hidden on Peach Blossom Island, together with the Nine Yin Manual and the 'Eighteen Subduing Dragon Palms' manual. The Saber carries a piece of an iron-plated map of the books' location, while another half of the map is in the saber's counterpart, the Heaven Reliant Sword. The Saber is passed on to Guo Jing's son Guo Polu, but is later lost in the wulin by the time of the Yuan dynasty. The Sword comes into the possession of Guo's younger daughter Guo Xiang, who founds the Emei School later.

The Heaven Sword and Dragon Saber
Nearly a century after the Battle of Xiangyang, the Dragon Slaying Saber is taken by Xie Xun after it is found by the Heavenly Eagle Cult. Xie keeps it with him for several years as he lives on an isolated island away from the Chinese mainland. He loses it to Zhou Zhiruo later. Zhou breaks the weapon by clashing it against the Heaven Reliant Sword, and the items hidden in the blades are revealed. The Book of Wumu comes into Zhang Wuji's possession and Zhang uses one of the strategies detailed in the book to defeat the Ruyang Prince's forces at the siege of Mount Song. He passes the book to Xu Da later and Xu becomes a brilliant military leader after studying it. Xu leads the Ming Cult rebel forces to overthrow the Yuan Dynasty and becomes one of the founding pioneers of the Ming Dynasty.

Condor Trilogy
Fictional books